Bakalauri is a village development committee in Sunsari District in the Kosi Zone of south-eastern Nepal. At the time of the 1991 Nepal census it had a population of 11,835 people living in 2276 individual households.

References

Populated places in Sunsari District